The Peruvian Volleyball Federation is the governing body of volleyball and beach volleyball in Peru. Formed February 24th, 1942, its headquarters are in the capital city of Lima. The FPV is a member of the International Volleyball Federation (FIVB) and the South American Volleyball Confederation (CSV) and it is affiliated to the Instituto Peruano del Deporte IPD (Spanish for Peruvian Sports Institute) and the Peruvian Olympic Committee.

It organizes both the men's and women's Liga Nacional Superior de Voleibol (Spanish for Senior National Volleyball League), which are the top level's volleyball competition in Peru. It also organizes international cups which are registered at the FIVB such as the Copa Latina. The organization also administrates the Peru men's national volleyball team and the Peru women's national volleyball team.

References

External links
 Official Web

Volley
Volleyball in Peru
Peru